Eglis Yaima de la Cruz (born 12 April 1980 in Sancti Spíritus) is a Cuban sports shooter. She won the bronze medal at the 2008 Summer Olympics, the first and, as of 2020, only female medalist for her country in the sport. She has competed at five editions of the Olympics, from Athens 2004 to Tokyo 2020.

At the Pan American Games, she has won nine medals through five editions, four of them gold.

References

External links
 

1980 births
Living people
Shooters at the 2004 Summer Olympics
Shooters at the 2008 Summer Olympics
Shooters at the 2012 Summer Olympics
Shooters at the 2016 Summer Olympics
Shooters at the 2020 Summer Olympics
Olympic shooters of Cuba
Olympic bronze medalists for Cuba
Cuban female sport shooters
People from Sancti Spíritus
Shooters at the 2007 Pan American Games
Pan American Games gold medalists for Cuba
Pan American Games silver medalists for Cuba
Olympic medalists in shooting
Medalists at the 2008 Summer Olympics
Pan American Games medalists in shooting
Shooters at the 2015 Pan American Games
Shooters at the 2019 Pan American Games
Medalists at the 2007 Pan American Games
Medalists at the 2015 Pan American Games
Medalists at the 2019 Pan American Games
20th-century Cuban women
20th-century Cuban people
21st-century Cuban women